Reach Out! is an album by American pianist Hal Galper's Quintet, released on the Danish SteepleChase label in 1977.

Critical reception

The Allmusic review by Ken Dryden states, "Hal Galper was on a tour during the 1970s, writing a number of adventurous post-bop compositions and getting regular opportunities to record them ... This is easily one of [his] best recordings".

Track listing
All compositions by Hal Galper unless noted.
 "Reach Out" – 9:12
 "I'll Never Stop Loving You" (Nicholas Brodszky, Sammy Cahn) – 7:15
 "Spidit" – 5:57
 "My Man's Gone Now" (George Gershwin, DuBose Heyward) – 3:51 Bonus track on CD reissue
 "Waiting for Chet" – 8:09
 "I Can't Get Started" (Vernon Duke, Ira Gershwin) – 3:14
 "Children of the Night" – 13:14

Personnel
 Hal Galper – piano
 Randy Brecker – trumpet
 Michael Brecker – tenor saxophone, flute
 Wayne Dockery – bass
 Billy Hart – drums

References

SteepleChase Records albums
Hal Galper albums
1977 albums